Ngeté-Herdé, also known as Lamé, is an Afro-Asiatic dialect cluster of Chad. Varieties are:
Dzəpaw, or Lamé
Ngeté (Nguetté), or Sorga-Ngeté
Herdé (He’dé), or Heɗe-Rong

Zime is a generic name.

References 

Chadic languages
Languages of Chad